The Tale of a Manor is an 1899 novel by the Swedish writer Selma Lagerlöf. It tells the story of a young woman who tries to rescue the man she loves from madness, caused by shame and sorrow. It was published in English in 1923, in a portmanteau volume titled The Tale of a Manor and Other Sketches. The 1923 film The Blizzard by Mauritz Stiller is loosely based on the novel.

See also
 1899 in literature
 Neo-romanticism
 Swedish literature

References

1899 Swedish novels
Swedish novels adapted into films
Novels by Selma Lagerlöf
Albert Bonniers Förlag books
Swedish-language novels
Novels adapted into operas